Carmen Sanguinetti Masjuan (born 1977) is a Uruguayan politician of the Colorado Party (PC), serving as Senator since 1 March 2020.

Education 
Graduated from the Catholic University of Uruguay, she has a bachelor's degree in Business Administration. After graduating, she moved to the United States, where he obtained a master's degree in Public Policy from the Northeastern University. She has served as Executive Director of the company Sistemas B Uruguay.

Political career 
For the 2019 presidential primaries, Sanguinetti joins Ciudadanos, a faction of the Colorado Party led by Ernesto Talvi.

She was the advisor on the issue of disability in the presidential campaign of Ernesto Talvi in 2019. In the general election of that year, she was elected first substitute of Senator Ernesto Talvi. When Talvi took office as Minister of Foreign Affairs, on March 1, 2020, Sanguinetti took the seat for the 49th Legislature. In addition, the post was ratified after Talvi's definitive resignation from politics.

Private life 
Carmen Sanguinetti is the niece of politician Jorge Sanguinetti, who is the cousin of former president Julio María Sanguinetti.

Her husband is Alberto Brause. The couple have three children: Trinidad, Benjamin and Isabel.

References

External links 
 Carmen Sanguinetti's virtual office
 

1977 births
Living people
Politicians from Montevideo
Uruguayan people of Italian descent
Colorado Party (Uruguay) politicians
Members of the Senate of Uruguay (2020–2025)
21st-century Uruguayan women politicians
21st-century Uruguayan politicians
Catholic University of Uruguay alumni
Northeastern University alumni